Monday is an unincorporated community in Hocking County, in the U.S. state of Ohio.

History
A post office called Monday was established in 1880, and remained in operation until 1914. The community took its name from Monday Creek. In 1883, Monday had a population of approximately 400 residents.

References

Unincorporated communities in Hocking County, Ohio
Unincorporated communities in Ohio